The Swiss Super League (known as the Credit Suisse Super League for sponsorship reasons) is a Swiss professional league in the top tier of the Swiss football league system and has been played in its current format since the 2003–04 season. As of January 2022, the Swiss Super League is ranked 14th in Europe according to UEFA's ranking of league coefficients, which is based upon Swiss team performances in European competitions. The 2022–23 season will be the 126th season of the Swiss top-flight, making it the longest continuously running top-flight national league.

Overview 
The Super League is played over 36 rounds from the end of July to May, with a winter break from mid-December to the first week of February. Each team plays each other four times, twice at home and twice away, in a round-robin. 

As teams from both Switzerland and Liechtenstein participate in the Swiss football leagues, only a Swiss club finishing in first place will be crowned champion—should a team from Liechtenstein win, this honor will go to the highest-placed Swiss team. Relative to their league coefficient ranking the highest-placed teams will compete in UEFA competitions—again with exception of teams from Liechtenstein, who qualify through the Liechtenstein Cup. The bottom team will be relegated to the Challenge League and replaced by the respective champion for the next season. The club finishing in 9th place will compete against the second-placed team of the Challenge League in a relegation play-off over two games, home and away, for a spot in the succeeding tournament.

Matches in the Super League employ the use of a video assistant referee.

History

Serie A era 

The Swiss Football Association was founded in 1895, but were initially unable to organize an annual competition, citing the teams' travel costs. The first inofficial championship, competed for the Ruinart Cup, was organized by Genevan newspaper La Suisse sportive as a response in 1897. It was mainly contested by teams from the French-speaking area, with the exception of FC Zürich and Grasshopper Club Zürich, the latter of which eventually won the tournament. The inaugural official championship was therefore organized for the following season, in 1898–99, and won by Anglo-American Club against Old Boys Basel. It was, however, only competed by Swiss-German teams (with the exception of a team from Neuchâtel) until 1900, due to a dispute about playing on Sundays.

Teams from the canton of Zürich continued to dominate the league until 1907–08, with Grasshoppers winning a further three, FC Winterthur winning two, and FC Zürich winning one title. Other champions from that time included Servette, St. Gallen, and Young Boys, who subsequently also won three in a row from 1908–1911. Over the next decade, FC Aarau, Montriond LS (now Lausanne-Sport), SC Brühl, and Cantonal Neuchâtel FC each won their first title as nobody managed to monopolize the league. During the 1920s and 1930s, championships were achieved almost exclusively by modern Super League regulars, namely Grasshoppers, Servette, Zürich, Young Boys, Lausanne-Sport, and FC Lugano. FC Bern was the exception in 1923; however, their championship was denied after the use of an unauthorized player.

Nationalliga era 
The league was reformed into the Nationalliga in 1931 and initially changed from three regional groups to two groups with 9 teams each. The league composition thereafter varied on several occasions, ranging from 12 to 16 teams competing in a single group. Contrary to its neighboring countries, national football was not suspended during World War II due to Switzerland's neutrality, but the post-war years nevertheless brought change. The 1944–45 season saw the separation of the league into the Nationalliga A and B, with the winner of the former declared Swiss champion. The 1946–47, 1947–48, 1952–53, and 1953–54 seasons saw further maiden victories achieved by FC Biel-Bienne, AC Bellinzona, FC Basel, and FC La-Chaux-de-Fonds, respectively. In 1954, broadcasting rights were sold to SRG SSR for the first time, with the company initially being restricted in showing games on TV. For the 1956–57 season, jersey numbers were declared mandatory, with Young Boys initiating an unprecedented streak of four titles the same season. 

The 1966–67 season first saw the emergence of Basel as a dominant team, as they won 7 of the following 14 seasons. As shirt sponsors first appeared by 1976, the SRG SSR refused to broadcast teams that wore advertisements on their kits. As a result, the broadcaster and the league reached a compromise, where the former would only show sponsors in reports lasting a maximum of 6 minutes, and teams would be obligated to wear neutral jerseys for longer appearances. The 1980s and 1990s saw Grasshoppers dominate and Neuchâtel Xamax, FC Luzern, and FC Sion win their first titles in 1986–87, 1988–89, and 1991–92. In 1985, the number of foreigners on a team was increased from one to two, promptly leading to a new transfer record of 1.3 million francs with Servette acquiring Mats Magnusson. In 1992–93 Aarau won the championship the first time in 79 years, while St. Gallen earned their first title in 97 years at the turn of the millennium.

Super League era 
The rebranding of the Nationalliga A into the Super League occurred in 2003, when the league was restructured from 12 to 10 teams for the 2003–04 season, simplifying the format by removing the relegation playoff round. A return to 12 teams was discussed on multiple occasions in 2009 and 2018, but ultimately rejected, among others due to reservations about the early relegation battle.

This new era initially proved to be one of domination for Basel, as 11 of the first 14 seasons were won by them, including a record-breaking streak of 8 championships between 2009 and 2017. After a change in leadership in 2017, however, they were dethroned by Young Boys, who won the next four straight championships.

Format Change

In April 2022, another proposal by the SFL committee to increase the league size to 12 was announced. The proposal includes three stages: an initial round-robin qualifying stage with all 12 teams (22 rounds); an intermediary stage, with two groups (1st-6th placed in the Championship and 7-12th placed in the Qualification Group) of six teams each (10 rounds); the format of the third and final playoff phase is still to be determined. Despite pushback from fans and a general negative response from club officials,  the proposal to increase the league size as well as the proposed format change were approved by the general assembly of the Swiss Football League on 20 May 2022. 

The details of the final playoff stage was also finalized: 

 The first and second placed teams of the Championship Group will play a best of three Championship Final. The first placed team has home advantage in the first and third game. 
 The 3rd-6th placed teams of the Championship Group and the 1st-4th placed teams of the Qualification Group (eight teams total) will play a three round playoff for the remaining spots in international championships. The playoff will be carried out according to the European model, with home and away games except in the final match. Teams are seeded according to their placement.
 The 5th placed team of the Qualification Group will play a relegation playoff against the second placed team of the Challenge League. The last placed team is relegated directly. 

The new format will be implemented for the 2023–24 season, while the transitional 2022–23 season season will have only the last placed team playing a relegation playoff against the 3rd place of the Challenge League. A change of format for the Swiss Challenge League is not yet clear.

In October 2022, following heavy fan protests, reigning champions FC Zürich officially submitted a request to repeal the decision to introduce the play-off modus. Instead they propose to use the system used in the Scottish Premiership. An according fan petition gathered 18,000 signatures (including national team star Breel Embolo) in the first day of its publication and Super League heavy-weights BSC Young Boys officially supported the motion immediately. This triggered a renewed vote by the general assembly. 

On 11 November 2022, the new proposal to instead use the "Scottish Model" was approved by the general assembly of the Swiss Football League. By the time of the vote, the petition opposing the play-off system had gathered over 60,000 signatures. The increased number of teams was not up for a re-vote, though. The new format is as follows: 

 In a first phase all twelve teams play each other three times each, for a total of 33 matchdays.
 Following that, the league is split into two groups of six each, one "Championship Group" and one "Relegation Group". 
 Each team will play every other team in their group one time (five matches each), for a total of 38 matchdays. 
 The Championship Group will play for the title of Swiss Football Champion and qualification to European championships.
 The Relegation Group will play against relegation (last place) and qualification to the relegation play-off (second-to-last place).
 Points won in the first phase are carried over to the second phase.

Current season

Promotion/relegation from 2021–22 season
 FC Lausanne-Sport (10th) was relegated from the Swiss Super League
 Winterthur (1st) was promoted to the Swiss Super League
 FC Luzern (9th in Super League) defeated FC Schaffhausen (2nd in Challenge League) in the relegation play-offs to remain in the Super League

Team records

Performance by club

{| class="wikitable" style="width:600px;"
|-
!Titles!!Club
!Last Championship won
|-
|||
|2003
|-
|||
|2017
|-
|||
|1999
|-
|||
|2021
|-
|||
|2022
|-
|||
|1965
|-
|||
|1964
|-
|||
|1949
|-
|||
|1917
|-
|||
|1993
|-
|||
|1988
|-
|||
|2000
|-
|||
|1997
|-
|||
|1899
|-
|||
|1947
|-
|||
|1989
|-
|||
|1915
|-
|||
|1919
|-
|||
|1948

Performance by club (professional era only)

Player records 
All records are since the introduction of the Super League in 2003.

Players in italics are still active. As of 15 December 2020.

 Most championships: Marco Streller (8 times): 2004, 2008, 2010, 2011, 2012, 2013, 2014, 2015; with FC Basel
 Most appearances: Nelson Ferreira (421 appearances); with FC Thun and FC Luzern
 Most goals overall: Marco Streller (111 goals); with FC Basel
 Most times top scorer: Seydou Doumbia (3 times): 2009 (20 goals), 2010 (30); with BSC Young Boys; 2017 (20); with FC Basel
 Most goals in a season: Jean-Pierre Nsame (32 goals): 2020; with BSC Young Boys
 Most minutes without conceding: Roman Bürki (660 minutes): 2012; with Grasshopper Club 
 Fastest perfect hattrick: Mohamed Kader (6 minutes): 31 August 2003; with Servette FC against BSC Young Boys (4–1)
 Oldest player: Andris Vaņins (40 years 3 months 4 days): 3 August 2020; with FC Zürich
 Youngest player: Sascha Studer (15 years 6 months 18 days): 1 April 2007; with FC Aarau
 Oldest goalscorer: Walter Samuel (38 years 21 days): 13 April 2016; with FC Basel against FC Lugano (4–1)
 Youngest goalscorer: Endoğan Adili (15 years 9 months 10 days): 13 May 2010; with Grasshopper Club against FC Aarau (4–1)

See also

Sports league attendances

References

External links

 League table and results
 Official website 
 Official website 
  Super League Results, Fixtures and Stats
  Map of Swiss Super League Stadiums
 Switzerland – List of Champions, RSSSF.com

 
1
Switzerland
Sports leagues established in 1897
1897 establishments in Switzerland
Football
Professional sports leagues in Switzerland